1976 saw the start of the first ever professional football league in the Kingdom of Saudi Arabia.

The championship was won by Al-Hilal. Al-Riyadh on the other hand would be the first team to be relegated from the top flight.

Stadia and locations

League table

Full records are not known at this time

External links 
 RSSSF Stats
 Saudi Arabia Football Federation
 Saudi League Statistics
 Article writer for Saleh Al-Hoireny - Al-Jazirah newspaper 13-08-2010

Saudi Premier League seasons
Saudi
1976–77 in Saudi Arabian football